Nick Webb may refer to:
 Nick Webb (musician) (1954–1998), British musician and founder of Acoustic Alchemy
 Nick Webb (soccer) (born 1986), American professional soccer player
 Nick Webb (journalist) (born 1971), Irish newspaper journalist and author
 Nick Webb (boxer) (born 1987), British boxer